A vaginal dilator (sometimes called a vaginal trainer) is an instrument used to gently stretch the vagina. They are used when the vagina has become narrowed (vaginal stenosis), such as after brachytherapy for gynecologic cancers, and as therapy for vaginismus and other forms of dyspareunia.

There is evidence for dilator use across many different diagnoses with fair to good results. This includes following cancer treatments and for vaginal agenesis conditions. The evidence presents varying approaches and protocols.

Vaginal dilators, also called vaginal stents or vaginal expanders, can be inflatable and are used during surgeries. Vaginal stents are routinely used in postoperative care for transgender patients who have undergone vaginoplasty as part of gender confirmation surgery. They are also used for various conditions, such as vaginal agenesis. The vaginal expander is used immediately after surgery to keep the passage from healing, and regularly thereafter to maintain the viability of the neovagina. Frequency of use requirements decrease over time, but remains obligatory lifelong.

Use
With solid vaginal dilators, the patient starts with the smallest dilator size, then gradually increasing until the largest dilator size is reached. This practice can be accompanied by breathing exercises in order to relax the pelvic floor muscles. Dilation acts should not cause pain or bleeding. Dilatation with rigid dilators must be done carefully as vaginal perforation and urethral injury may occur. There is no consensus on the frequency and duration of using vaginal dilators. In case of vaginal expanders, the therapist or the patient introduces the deflated balloon into the vagina and then inflates it gently until the required diameter is obtained.

Image gallery

See also
 Dildo
 Anal dilator
 Dilator

References

Gynaecology
Medical equipment